Jayne and Mason Bank Building is a historic bank building located at Webster in Monroe County, New York. It is a Beaux Arts style structure built in 1906 to house the Jayne and Mason Bank.

It was listed on the National Register of Historic Places in 2006.  Joining it on the Register is the home of one of the bank's owners, the William C. Jayne House, located less than one half mile east.

References

External links
Webster Museum: Webster History: The Jayne & Mason Bank

Bank buildings on the National Register of Historic Places in New York (state)
Beaux-Arts architecture in New York (state)
Commercial buildings completed in 1906
Buildings and structures in Monroe County, New York
National Register of Historic Places in Monroe County, New York
1906 establishments in New York (state)